Thumatha senex, the round-winged muslin, is a moth of the family Erebidae. It is found in northern and central Europe, the Alps, northern Asia Minor, the Crimea and south-western Siberia.

Technical description and variation

The wingspan is 15–20 mm. Not unlike Nudaria mundana ( mundana has less-rounded forewings and a more transparent appearance, less obvious spots). The central spot at the apex of the cell distinct; a larger shadowy spot at the middle of the costa, and before the marginal area of the forewing a row of spots which are especially distinct in the costal region. Another curved row of spots bounds the basal third of the forewing. The wings are sparsely scaled, giving them a thin, papery appearance.

Biology
Adults are on wing from mid-June to mid-August in one generation.

Egg round, yellow. Larva ashy grey, very hairy, with black head. The larvae feed on lichen (especially Peltigera canina) and mosses. Pupa stumpy, dark brown, in a dense hairy cocoon.

The moths fly on damp meadows, and are not rare in their flight-places; they come to the light at night.

References

External links
 Round-winged muslin on UKmoths
 Lepidoptera of Belgium
 Lepiforum.de

Nudariina
Moths described in 1808
Moths of Asia
Moths of Europe
Taxa named by Jacob Hübner